301 Howard Street is a twenty-three-floor,  skyscraper in San Francisco, California, completed in 1988.

References

Skyscraper office buildings in San Francisco
Office buildings completed in 1988
Financial District, San Francisco
1988 establishments in California